Glabella is the space between the eyebrows and above the nose in human anatomy.

Glabella may also refer to:
 Glabella (gastropod), a sea snail genus in the family Marginellidae
 Glabella (trilobite anatomy), the expression of the axial lobe in the cephalon of a trilobite